Petr Dezort (born 17 January 1975) is a former professional tennis player from the Czech Republic.

Biography
Dezort former Czech tennis representative. Currently working as Director and Head coach at TOPTENNIS academy in Czech Republic
He won over 20 ITF men's tournaments in doubles and 10 in singles. He made his only main draw ATP Tour appearance in 1999, in the doubles at the Croatia Open, held in Umag. He and partner Leoš Friedl were beaten in the first round by Spaniards Carlos Moyá and Roberto Carretero, in three sets. His two Challenger titles, won in Tampere and Budaörs, were both in doubles. As a singles player he had a win over Nikolay Davydenko at the 2001 Linz Challenger and also registered wins during his Challenger career against Mario Ančić and Juan Ignacio Chela. He played in the qualifying rounds at all four Grand Slam tournaments.

Challenger titles

Doubles: (2)

References

External links
 
 

1975 births
Living people
Czech male tennis players